The Apostolic Administration of Atyrau  is a pastoral area sui iuris, not yet fully a diocese, in western Kazakhstan which forms part of the Roman Catholic Church in this country, namely of the metropolitan Roman Catholic Archdiocese of Mary Most Holy in Nur-Sultan. 

Its head is a prelate called Apostolic Administrator, member of the Catholic Bishops’ Conference of Central Asia.
His see is the Cathedral of the Transfiguration of Our Lord, in Atyrau. Current Administrator is a Slovakian priest, Fr. Peter Sakmár. Former Apostolic Administrator, Italian Bishop Adelio Dell'Oro became the diocesan bishop of the Roman Catholic Diocese of Karaganda.

History 
Apostolic Administration of Atyrau was established by the Holy See on 7 July 1999   together with other three dioceses in Kazakhstan which formerely were one Apostolic Administration of Kazakhstan.

Administrators 
 Janusz Kaleta (1999.07.07 – 2011.02.05), Titular Bishop of Phelbes (2006.09.15 – 2011.02.05); 
 stayed on as Apostolic Administrator ad nutum Sanctae Sedis'' of Atyrau (Kazakhstan) (2011.02.05 – 2012.12.07) while elevated to the see of Karaganda, then went on solely as Bishop of Karaganda 
 Adelio Dell’Oro (2012.12.07 – 2015.05.16), Titular Bishop of Castulo
 Fr. Dariusz Buras (2015.05.16 – 2020.12.08)
 Fr. Peter Sakmár (2020.12.08 - ...)

Parishes 
There are several churches in the main cities of Western Kazakhstan which belong to the Apostolic Administration of Aturau.
 Cathedral church of the Transfiguration of Our Lord in Atyrau.
 Divine Mercy Church in Kulsary
 The Good Shepherd Church in Aktobe
 Holy Family Church in Khromtau
 Sacred Heart Church in Aktau
 Our Lady of Perpetual Help Church in Uralsk
 Saint Joseph Church in Aksay

See also
Roman Catholicism in Kazakhstan

References

External links 
 GigaCatholic, with incumbent biography links

Christian organizations established in 1999
Apostolic administrations
Roman Catholic dioceses in Kazakhstan
1999 establishments in Kazakhstan